Jen Jack Gieseking is an environmental psychologist, author, and associate professor of geography at the University of Kentucky.

Their first monograph, A Queer New York: Geographies of Lesbians, Dykes, and Queers, 1983-2008 was published in 2020 and won the 2021 Glenda Laws Award from the American Association of Geographers.
 
Gieseking is managing editor of ACME: International Journal of Critical Geography and contributor to the National Park Service's LGBTQ America: A Theme Study of Lesbian, Gay, Bisexual, Transgender, and Queer History. Other publications include: People, Place and Space Reader, a chapter in Queer Presences and Absences entitled Queering the Meaning of ‘Neighborhood': Reinterpreting the Lesbian-Queer Experience of Park Slope, Brooklyn, 1983-2008. 

Gieseking has a bachelor's from Mount Holyoke College (1999), a master's from Union Theological Seminary (2004), and a PhD from the CUNY Graduate Center (2013).

References

External links

Living people
Year of birth missing (living people)
University of Kentucky faculty
Mount Holyoke College alumni
Union Theological Seminary (New York City) alumni
Graduate Center, CUNY alumni
American academics
LGBT psychologists